Saint-Père-sur-Loire (literally Saint-Père on Loire) is a commune in the Loiret department in north-central France.

See also
Communes of the Loiret department

References

Saintperesurloire